The Santa Anita Golf Course, located in the city of Arcadia, California, was operated by Santa Anita Associates for the Los Angeles County Department of Parks and Recreation from 1986-2016.  New operators will take over beginning September 2016.

History
The  upon which the golf course was built has always been devoted to recreation in some form or another. The original architect was James Harrison Smith. Originally part of the "Lucky" Baldwin Ranch, Santa Anita's history dates back to the days when its broad oaks sheltered places where Indians camped. Across its broad acres traveled Mission Fathers from San Gabriel on their way up Little Santa Anita Canyon for lumber needed to build the Mission.

From 1907 through 1909 horse racing was a feature on Lucky Baldwin's famed track. The clubhouse turn was right where No. 16 is now and when you're on the hill on the backside of No. 14, that's the turn where the horses turned for home.

World War I Years

During World War I, Ross Field, Named after Lt. Cleo J. Ross of the U.S. Army Air Service, housed a United States Army balloon school.  Ross was an observer with the 8th Balloon Company and was killed in action in France on September 26, 1918, the only U.S. Army balloonist to die in combat.  The balloon school closed in the spring on 1919.

Anita Baldwin sold the land to the County of Los Angeles for $92,000 in 1918. A sand green golf course appeared following the closure of the school and Arcadia citizens took it over and operated it as a highly successful club.

Depression Era

In 1935, through an act of Congress, the United States Department of War deeded 185 acres to Los Angeles County with the provision that it be used as a park and recreation center.  The redevelopment of Ross Field was a Works Progress Administration project that included not just the golf course but a swimming pool, tennis courts, two baseball fields, a children's playground, and a lawn bowling complex.

The Course Opens

The Santa Anita Golf course opened in two stages.  Nine holes were opened in April 1938 and the complete 18 opened on October 12, 1938.

1938 also saw the birth of the Santa Anita Open—held each year until 1955, in the middle of October, to celebrate the opening of the Golf Course and to start the official Winter Golf Tournament season in Southern California. Prize money that first year was $1,000. Frank Moninger personally underwrote the first two tournaments. The Santa Anita Golf Club with the help of a few individual golfers underwrote the next few events. The County donated the Golf Course for the Santa Anita Open. The Course Record established in the days of "The Open" is 62 - held by Ellsworth Vines. Lloyd Mangrum won the first and second Opens with 274 and 278. Par at that time was 70.

The Course Changes

In the 1960s the 9th hole was altered to make way for the construction of a baseball field at Arcadia Park.  The original tee box was re-positioned to the South West of its original location and the hole was lengthened and turned into a par 5 thus changing par at the course to 71.  The original dog leg left configuration and chute of trees has been lost and the hole now plays due east and relatively straight.  Additionally significant changes were made to the short 281 yard par 4 17th hole where the large expanse of sand on the left side (south) was replaced with grass.  The hole retains its name from the time (Desert) but has lost much character and altered the strategic challenge of its original configuration.  Other changes from the era include the removal of several bunkers on the Par 5 Third hole and the sandy waste area between the 10th and 18th holes.

As part of the change in management in 1986 commitments were made to increase secondary facilities (clubhouse and dining) as well as substantive changes to the course itself during 1990-1991.  The first hole and the driving range were swapped for safety reasons as errant shots from the range threatened cars on Santa Anita Avenue.  The original dog leg left 1st hole was shortened from 409 yards to the current 367 yards.  The 18th Green was moved forward to make way for clubhouse construction but the total yardage remained the same as the tee box was lengthened.  

During the 2000-2010 period small modifications were made to return a single bunker to the right of the 3rd hole (where the original design had three) and a large bunker in the center of the fairway of that same hole.  Tee boxes on the 4th, 7th and 17th holes were modified.  The detached tee boxes on 7th and 17th are seldom if ever used in open play though are occasionally used in tournament play.

Current Course hole by hole

1st Hole 371 yard Par 4.  Named "Thomas" for noted golf architect George C. Thomas Jr.  Thomas designed the Los Angeles Country Club North Course, Riviera and Bel Air Country Club.  The original design was a 425 yard dogleg left par 4.  The fairway for the opening hole was re-routed in 1989 when the driving range and first fairway were swapped.  The original green remains in use but is now approached from the north.    

2nd Hole 364 yard Par 4.  Named "Dune" for the large bunker that fronts the green.  The original design featured two fairway bunkers, a large one on the right and a small pot bunker on the left.  The fairway bunkers were removed as the tree line matured in the 1960s. The green is elevated and crowned which makes for challenging approaches.  Two sets of tees exist, the most often used sits to the north, the second tee box is located behind a stand of trees near Campus Drive.

3rd Hole 554 yard Par 5.  Named "Power" for the strength required to reach the green when the original design measured 580 yards. The spacious fairway provides lots of room for tee and second shots.  A bunker complex on the right side of the landing area was lost in the 1960s and a single bunker was added in the early 2000s. The landing area for second shots is undulating and features a central bunker that forces a decision on the angle of approach to the green.  The green features a large bunker front and two behind.  An approach from the right opens up the green.  

4th Hole 130 yard Par 3. Named "Maiden" after the 6th Hole at Royal St. Georges in Sandwich England.  The "Maiden" Par 3 template features a green with two tiers or humps in the back of the green with a valley between.  The 4th green is bracketed by two bunkers and slopes heavily towards a false front. Long shots will find a down slope and a difficult chip back to the green.  The devilish back left pin position makes for one of the most difficult shots on the course.    

5th Hole 375 yard Par 4.  Named "Railroad" for the tracks that once ran along the left side of the fairway.  As designed the tee shot played over a small creek which was turned into a cemented wash in 1956 which now bisects the teeing ground and runs along the left.  A ridge runs diagonally across the fairway in the landing zone and will hold back a short drive forcing a long shot to an elevated and well protected green.  As designed the area to the left of the green featured a bunker that was replaced with a grassy swale that allowed a secure bailout option.  A bunker was restored to this area in the late 1990s.  The kidney shaped green with a false front is protected by a large bunker to the right.  The angle, slope and elevation of the green provides a difficult challenge with a premium on proper club selection. 

6th Hole 411 yard par 4.  Named "Hogback" for the football shaped elevated green.  The fairway is open but influenced by a large tree on the right. The second shot may be the most difficult on the course.  The green is 38 yards deep and protected by a false front, a large bunker on the left and a massive 20 foot drop off to the right.  The swale to the right of the green was subtle as designed, but with time and traffic it has eroded and now will challenge the unfortunate golfer with an extraordinarily difficult recovery shot from a dirt lie.  Par is a very good score on this very difficult hole.  

7th Hole 379 yard Par 4.  Named "Narrows" for the wide fairway that narrows as it approaches the hole.  The dog leg rewards a carry over a large bunker on the left.  A bale out on the right will punish with uneven lies and a much lengthened second shot. The narrow and deep green is protected with a bunker left and out of bounds right.  Club selection is critical as the green slope will heavily influence shots that land on the right side of the green. 

8th Hole 193 yard Par 3.  Named "Dam" for the view of Monrovia's Sawpit Dam that was once visible from the teeing ground (now obscured by trees).  The hole was inspired by Pine Valley's famous 3rd hole. The original design featured a bunker left and right, but the right bunker was removed in the 1950s.  Time has increased the forward slope of the green and the large false front creates an optical illusion and complicates club selection.  Summer time shots freely bounce on the green, but winter shots with softer ground will not carry.

9th Hole 481 yard Par 5.  Named "Master".  Once one of the most challenging holes on the course, it has drifted furthest from the original design.  The original layout was a 445 yard Par 4 featuring a teeing ground now located in right field of the neighboring baseball field.  The tee ball was played down a chute of trees into a dog leg left.  The dog leg was protected by numerous bunkers left and shots played out to the right were funneled into a swale with difficult side and uphill lies.  The green was protected by a swale in the front and no bunkers.  The deep green sloped towards the back and with rear pin positions could play as long as 460 yards.  The green was rebuilt due to drainage issues in the 1940s and bunkers were added to the right.  The hole was completely reworked in 1972 when the baseball field was built and the maintenance yard relocated.  The hole now plays straight and has been increased to a Par 5.  The fairway still presents a challenge with slopes and swales but much of the challenged of the original design has been lost.  

10th Hole 353 yard Par 4.  Named the "Camel's  Hump" due to the large mound that protects the center of the green.  As constructed the hole ran straight to the green with the wide fairway protected by bunkers left, right and center.  The green is at fairway level (rare for the course) and the right and center bunkers were  removed in 1955 and the large mound placed in front of the green.  The green, the narrowest on the course at 51 feet and the widest at 111 feet, peaks behind the mound and slopes away side to side.  The hump obscures many of the pin positions and requires a thoughtful drive to insure an clear approach to the flag.   

11th Hole 407 yard Par 4.  Named "Wind" as it plays into the prevailing wind.  The slight dog leg left fairway is free of bunkers but features a spine that runs across the fairway that catches shorter drives.  The elevated green is protected by bunkers on each side and slopes toward a false front.  

12th Hole 207 yard Par 3. Named "Redan" after the famous 15th at North Berwick, Scotland.  As with its namesake, the 12th was designed to be protected by a left bunker with a green positioned at a 45 degree angle.  This classic piece of golf architecture usually is designed to be played with a running shot that would feed to the green and down to protected pin.  The changes with grasses over time has significantly limited this style of shot as it now grabs most approaches and forces a long carry into the green made more difficult by afternoon winds.  A second bunker was added in the 1950s and further complicates approaches.   

13th Hole 509 yard Par 5. Named "Pass" for the pass between two large mounds that funnels tee shots to the fairway center. Second shots can be blind and the fairway slopes hard to the right forcing the unfortunate into the trees or tree obstructed third shot.   A boomerang green is protected by bunkers left and right and slopes right left and back.  The green is best played to the center and par is a good score.

14th Hole 317 yard Par 4. Named "Crow's Nest" as an homage to Lucky Baldwin's old race track that once occupied the site.  The main grandstand featured a "Crow's Nest" observation point on the roof.  The back of the green is the highest point on the course.

15th Hole 189 yard Par 3. Named "Thorn" in honor of the rose bush planter that decorates the area between the 15th green and 16th tee.  The hole is protected by a large central bunker in front and another in the left rear.  The green slopes hard away from the left front.  Shots landing left of the bunker often trundle on to the putting surface.  Judging distance is very difficult on this challenging hole. 

16th hole 437 yard Par 4. Named "Darsie" after Darsie L. Darsie, Editor of the Los Angeles Herald Express Newspaper and a noted Golf writer.  The fairway was originally the main stretch of the old Lucky Baldwin racetrack.  As designed, the hole shared a large bunker with the 17th hole.  Following the 1955 remodel the maturing trees protect both sides and a swale on the left makes for uneven lies.  The green is protected by a tree and large bunker left.  The green favors a run up shot landing on the right which will feed down to the left sloping green.  The 16th is the #2 handicap hole and had destroyed many a good round with its challenges.    

17th Hole 292 yard Par 4. Named "Desert" in honor of a large 200 yard sand waste area that once ran up the left hand side of the fairway forcing tee shots to the right.  The angled and well bunkered green opens up from that side.  The sand area was removed as the trees between the 16th and 17th holes matured in 1955.

18th Hole 439 yard Par 4. Named "Climax" as it is the end of the round.  The difficult dog leg right once featured an extensive bunker complex and an out of bounds to the right along the 10th fairway (removed once the trees matured).  The fairway is undulating and the landing zone is bisected by a large ridge that runs away left to right from the teeing ground.  Time has deepened the area between the ridge and the fairway and significantly altered the strategic nature of the hole.  The depression is worn bare by carts and maintenance equipment and makes for an incredibly difficult second shot .  The original green was flat and protected by bunkers left and swales on the right.   The green was rebuilt in 1955 with a bunker to the rear.  Clubhouse expansion in 1989-1990 reduced the size of the green at the rear and increased the forward slope.

The Course Record

The current Par 71 record is held by Blake Moore of Monrovia, California who shot a 9 under par 62 on Sunday, July 20, 2003. "The Open" era par 70 record is held by Ellsworth Vines who shot an opening round 62 on October 16th, 1953 during the Santa Anita Open.

Scorecard

Scorecard for Santa Anita Golf Course circa 2010

See also
 Arcadia, California
 List of American Balloon Squadrons
 List of United States Army airfields

References

External links
 http://parks.lacounty.gov/Parkinfo.asp?URL=cms1_033057.asp&Title=Santa%20Anita%20Golf%20Course
 http://camp-john-wise-aerostation.com/ Ross Field
 http://www.militarymuseum.org/BalloonSch.html

Sports venues in Los Angeles County, California
Arcadia, California
Golf clubs and courses in California